Zen is a 2007 drama-horror film written and directed by Gary Davis and starring Kit DeZolt, Vivian Kong, and Lyndon Chan. Filmed in Florida, it was released and screened at a Boynton Beach, Florida cinema on April 12, 2007.

Plot
In 17th-Century Japan, a young samurai, Master Mitzu Zen, learns the secret way of killing vampires while learning about women and life in general.  Master Zen (Kit DeZolt), a naive master who doesn't know anything about women and love, goes on a quest to find out the truth about his parents' sacred sword. While meeting people along the way, he ends up running into more than he bargained for when he starts encountering vampires.

Cast
Kit DeZolt as Zen
Vivian Kong as Keiko
Lyndon Chan as Count Osaka
Asia Chao as Goju
Gilbert Henry as Lord Ito
Scott Rogers as Old Man
Radimus Ocean as Lord Mitzu
Cindy Chang as Lady Mitzu
Gerald Favis as Lord Yamazato

Count Osaka
Davis' 2009 film Count Osaka is a sequel to Zen, with DeZolt reprising his role as the original film's title character. It premiered December 2, 2009. It aired as part of the first Royal Palm Independent Film Festival in early 2010.

References

External links
 

2007 films
2007 action drama films
Films about Japanese Americans
2007 martial arts films
American vampire films
Films shot in Florida
2000s English-language films
2000s American films